The year 1990 was the 209th year of the Rattanakosin Kingdom of Thailand. It was the 45th year of the reign of King Bhumibol Adulyadej (Rama IX), and is reckoned as the year 2533 in the Buddhist Era.

Incumbents
King: Bhumibol Adulyadej
Crown Prince: Vajiralongkorn
Prime Minister: Chatichai Choonhavan
Supreme Patriarch: Nyanasamvara Suvaddhana

Events
 16 April - The Doi Luang National Park, covering areas in Chiang Rai, Lampang, and Phayao provinces, was inaugurated.

Births

Deaths

References

 
Years of the 20th century in Thailand
Thailand
Thailand
1990s in Thailand